Mattias Erik Johansson (born 16 February 1992) is a Swedish professional footballer who plays as a right back for Polish club Legia Warsaw. At international level, he has represented the senior national team and various youth teams of Sweden.

Club career
AZ Alkmaar signed Johansson on a four-year contract for a fee of around €1.5 million on 27 January 2012.

On 1 August 2017, Johansson, who had been released by AZ Alkmaar, moved to Super League Greece club Panathinaikos.

On 16 September 2018, he scored a brace in a 3–1 away win game against AEL. On 23 September 2018, he scored for the second game in the row, the third goal of Panathinaikos at the 3–0 victory against Levadiakos, a goal that made him the top scorer of Panathinaikos after four games. On 24 November 2018, Johansson scored a goal in a 5–1 home win game against struggling Apollon Smyrnis.

On 21 June 2021, Johansson signed a two-year deal with Polish Ekstraklasa champions Legia Warsaw.

Career statistics

Club

International 
Scores and results list Sweden's goal tally first, score column indicates score after each Johansson goal.

Honours
AZ
KNVB Cup: 2012–13

References

External links

Voetbal International profile 

1992 births
Living people
Swedish footballers
Sweden youth international footballers
Sweden under-21 international footballers
Sweden international footballers
Swedish expatriate footballers
Association football defenders
Kalmar FF players
AZ Alkmaar players
Panathinaikos F.C. players
Gençlerbirliği S.K. footballers
Legia Warsaw players
Allsvenskan players
Eredivisie players
Super League Greece players
Süper Lig players
Ekstraklasa players
Expatriate footballers in the Netherlands
Expatriate footballers in Greece
Expatriate footballers in Turkey
Expatriate footballers in Poland
Swedish expatriate sportspeople in the Netherlands
Swedish expatriate sportspeople in Greece
Swedish expatriate sportspeople in Turkey
Swedish expatriate sportspeople in Poland
People from Jönköping
Sportspeople from Jönköping County